The Ramlat al-Sab'atayn is a desert region that corresponds with the northern deserts of modern Yemen (Al-Jawf, Marib, Shabwah governorates) and southwestern Saudi Arabia (Najran province). Located at 15°42′N 46°20′E.

The Ramlat as Sab'atayn includes part of what was known to medieval Arab geographers as the Sayhad. It extends from al-Khawr to the edge of the Rub' al-Khālī or Empty Quarter. It includes the Yemeni muhafazahs of al-Jawf, Ma'rib and Shabwa.

References

Geography of Yemen
Deserts of Yemen